Barh Signaka is one of four departments in Guéra, a region of Chad. Its capital is Mongo.

Barh Signaka Department has a population of 118,620 (2016 survey) and 495 villages.

The Tele-Nugar Iron Mines, a UNESCO World Heritage Site, are located approximately 155 km south of Melfi.

References 

Departments of Chad
Guéra Region